The 2007 Gisborne earthquake occurred under the Pacific Ocean about  off the eastern coast of New Zealand's North Island at 8:55 pm NZDT on 20 December. The tremor had a moment magnitude of 6.7 and maximum Mercalli intensity of VII (Very Strong), and affected the city of Gisborne, but was felt widely across the country from Auckland in the north to Dunedin in the south.

Tectonic setting
New Zealand lies along the boundary between the Australian and Pacific plates.

 In the South Island, most of the relative displacement between these plates is taken up along a single dextral (right lateral) strike-slip fault with a major reverse component, the Alpine Fault.
 In the North Island, displacement is mainly taken up along the Kermadec-Tonga subduction zone, although the remaining dextral strike-slip component is accommodated by the North Island Fault System. Subduction off the coast takes place at the Hikurangi Trench, which runs parallel to the East Coast of the North Island and is the southern extension from the Kermadec Trench, however earthquakes here occur less frequently.

Effects
While the earthquake was initially reported to have caused no deaths, an elderly woman in Gisborne suffered a heart attack and died shortly after the quake. A number of buildings in central Gisborne were damaged.  The central business district was closed off to allow building inspectors to assess buildings for damage; three buildings had collapsed.  There were blackouts immediately after the earthquake hit. The town clock stopped at 8:55 pm. As of 14 January 2008, the Earthquake Commission had received over 3100 insurance claims amounting to $16 million. It was earlier estimated that the cost of damage caused by the earthquake could rise to $30 million.

See also
 List of earthquakes in 2007
 List of earthquakes in New Zealand

References

External links
 New Zealand earthquake report – Magnitude 6.7, Thursday, 20 December 2007 at 8:55:17 pm (NZDT). GeoNet.
 M 6.6 – off the east coast of the North Island of New Zealand (U.S. Geological Survey)

History of the Gisborne District
2007 Gisborne earthquake
Gisborne
Gisborne
December 2007 events in  New Zealand
2007 disasters in New Zealand